Leighton Coleman (May 3, 1837 - December 14, 1907) was an American clergyman of the Episcopal Church.

Biography
He was born in Philadelphia, Pennsylvania, and graduated at the General Theological Seminary (New York City) in 1861. he was ordained deacon on July 1, 1860. From 1860 until 1862, he served as a missionary on Randalls and Wards Islands in New York. He was ordained priest on May 15, 1862.

He served his religion in a variety of positions and at different places. He was rector of churches in Bustleton, Pa., Wilmington, Del., Mauch Chunk, Pa., Toledo, Ohio, and Sayre, Pa.  He lived in England from 1879 to 1887.

In 1888 Leighton Coleman was consecrated the 2nd Bishop of Delaware in the Episcopal Church.  His consecration was on January 18, 1889 with Daniel Sylvester Tuttle being the chief consecrator.

Bishop Coleman was Grand Chaplain of the Grand Lodge of Masons of Pennsylvania and prelate of the Knights Templar, Chaplain General of the Society of the War of 1812, Chaplain of the Delaware Society of the Cincinnati, and Vice President of the Delaware Historical Society. He was elected a thirty-third degree Mason by the Consistory in Boston in September 1907.

Publications authored
 A History of the Lehigh Valley (1872)  
 The Church in America (1895)  
 A History of the Church in the United States (1901, in the "Oxford Church Text Series")

See also
 Raphael Morgan (Robert Josias Morgan, who was ordained to the Episcopal Deaconate by Bp. Coleman).

References

Sources
 The New York Times. Bishop Coleman of Delaware Dies. Sunday December 15, 1907. Page 13. (Obituary)

American Episcopal theologians
Clergy from Philadelphia
19th-century American Episcopal priests
American religious writers
Historians from Pennsylvania
General Theological Seminary alumni
1837 births
1907 deaths
American Freemasons
Episcopal bishops of Delaware